Banksia borealis is a species of sprawling shrub that is endemic to Western Australia. It has leaves with sharply pointed lobes on each side, between thirty and fifty flowers in a gold-coloured spike and egg-shaped fruit. There are two subspecies occurring in two disjunct areas.

Description
The stems have soft hairs held close to the surface.

Taxonomy and naming
This banksia was first formally described in 1996 by Alex George in the journal Nuytsia and given the name Dryandra borealis from specimens he collected in 1966, near the road between Kalbarri and Ajana. In 2007, Austin Mast and Kevin Thiele transferred all the dryandras to the genus Banksia and this species became Banksia borealis. The specific epithet (borealis) is a Latin word meaning "northern" referring to the distribution of this species, the most northerly of all the dryandras.

In the same journal, George described two subspecies of Dryandra borealis, later moved to Banksia by Mast and Thiele, and the names are accepted by the Australian Plant Census:
 Banksia borealis A.S.George subsp. borealis is a shrub with a lignotuber;
 Banksia borealis subsp. elatior A.S.George lacks a lignotuber.

Distribution and habitat
Banksia borealis occurs in two disjunct areas of Western Australia. Subspecies borealis is relatively common and grows in Kwongan between Kalbarri, Northampton and Yuna. Subspecies elatior is only known from a few small populations near Three Springs where it grows in tall scrub and low woodland.

Conservation status
Subspecies borealis is classified as "not threatened" by the Western Australian Government Department of Parks and Wildlife, but subspecies elatior is classified as "Priority Three"  meaning that it is poorly known and known from only a few locations but is not under imminent threat.

References

borealis
Endemic flora of Western Australia
Eudicots of Western Australia
Plants described in 1996
Taxa named by Kevin Thiele